Ulrich Gasser (Frauenfeld, 19 April 1950) is a Swiss composer. After studying flute at Winterthur Conservatory he continued studies with flautist André Jaunet.

Selected works
 Von der unerbittlichen Zufälligkeit des Todes Oratorio for 6 female voices, 6 male voices, 8 flutes and 6 sounding stones. Jecklin 1995
 4 kleine Stücke (4 Little Pieces) for viola solo (1978)
 Steinstücke (Stone Pieces) for viola, piano, piano-string player and assistant (ad libitum) (1978)
 Und bräche nicht aus allen seinen Rändern aus wie ein Stern for viola and piano (1981–1984)
 Bel Air for viola and piano (2005)
 Sie verstanden seine Worte nicht, Station II from Kleine Passion am Stadtberg for viola and organ (2006)

References

External links
 
 Ulrich Gasser at Musinfo – The Database of Swiss Music
 Ulrich Gasser at the Living Composers Project

Swiss composers
Swiss male composers
1950 births
Living people
People from Frauenfeld